Baştürk is a Turkish surname. Notable people with the surname include:

 Nihat Baştürk (born 1973), Turkish footballer
 Selçuk Baştürk (born 1986), Turkish footballer
 Yıldıray Baştürk (born 1978), Turkish footballer

Turkish-language surnames